Eugène Koffi Kouamé (7 February 1988 – 10 July 2017) was an Ivorian professional football player.

Kouamé died on 10 July 2017 at the age of 29 after having suffered a heart attack following a game.

References

External links
  Career profile at sportbox.ru

1988 births
2017 deaths
Boluspor footballers
Expatriate footballers in Russia
Expatriate footballers in Turkey
FC SKA-Khabarovsk players
Ivorian footballers
Ivorian expatriate footballers
Footballers from Abidjan
Association football forwards
Association football players who died while playing
Accidental deaths in Ivory Coast